Rez Bomb is a 2008 feature film directed and written filmmaker Steven Lewis Simpson and starring Tamara Feldman, Trent Ford, Russell Means and Chris Robinson.

The film is a love story and thriller and is set in Pine Ridge Indian Reservation in South Dakota, which is the poorest place in the United States. The film was written to be shot in Scotland. The other main location was Rushville, Nebraska.

The film premiered at the Montreal World Film Festival in 2008.

Film festivals

2008
Montreal World  South Dakota  Fort Lauderdale  Southern Appalachian  Santa Fe

2009
Victoria  Glasgow  Bermuda  Tiburon

References

External links

2008 films
2008 romantic drama films
2000s thriller films
Films about Native Americans
2000s English-language films